Eystein Bærug (29 March 1923 – 1 September 1998) was a Norwegian politician for the Liberal Party.

He served as a deputy representative to the Parliament of Norway from Vestfold during the term 1973–1977. In total he met during 7 days of parliamentary session. He was also mayor of Brunlanes.

References

1923 births
1998 deaths
Deputy members of the Storting
Mayors of places in Vestfold
Liberal Party (Norway) politicians
People from Larvik